Carpathian Tragedies is the second solo studio album by Italian extreme metal vocalist Lord Vampyr. It was released on 3 February 2009 through Zero Effect Records. This would be the last album on which Lord Vampyr would play symphonic black metal; in the following album, Horror Masterpiece, he would shift to an industrial/gothic direction.

Track listing

Personnel
 Lord Vampyr (Alessandro Nunziati) — vocals
 Aeternus (Diego Tasciotti) — drums
 Endymion (Riccardo Studer) — keyboards
 Aerioch (Andrea di Nino) — bass
 Seth 666 (Andrea Taddei) — guitars
 Lady Eter — female backing vocals

Guest musicians
 Yog Sothoth — saxophone

Miscellaneous staff
 Chiara Battistoni — artwork
 Stefano Morabito — production
 Piergiovanni Lattanzi — photography

External links
 Lord Vampyr's official website

2009 albums
Lord Vampyr albums